Willows are a genus of trees.

Willow Tree may refer to:

Places
 Willow Tree, New South Wales, a village in Australia
 Willow Tree railway station, in Australia
 Willow Tree (LIRR station), a railway station in New York

Entertainment
 "Willow Tree", a 2020 song by Tash Sultana
 The Willow Tree (novel), a 1998 novel by Hubert Selby, Jr.
 The Willow Tree (2005 film), a 2005 Iranian film
 The Willow Tree (1920 film), a 1920 American silent film
 The Willow Tree (Rasputina album), a 2009 album
 "The Willow Tree", an alternate name for the folk song "Bury Me Beneath the Willow"

Other uses
 Willow Tree (figurines), a line of figurines

See also

 
 
 Willow (disambiguation)